Barny is a given name and a surname. Notable people with the name include:

Given name 
Barny Boatman (born 1956), English poker player

Surname 
Junes Barny (born 1989), Swedish football player
Bernard Barny de Romanet (1894–1921), French World War I flying ace 
Pedro Barny (born 1966), Portuguese football defender and manager

See also
Barney
Barni